Vilard Normcharoen (14 July 1962 – 7 January 2014) was a Thai Port FC player and one of Thailand's professional beach soccer players who won the award of best goalkeeper in the Beach Soccer World Cup 2002. Vilard made the transition from Futsal to beach soccer and was a great success for the national team and Normcharoen is the most experienced player in the Thailand national beach soccer team.

Honours

Individual
 2002 Beach Soccer World Championship -  "Best goalkeeper"

See also 
Thailand national futsal team
Thailand national beach soccer team
Thai Port FC

References

External links 
Thailand Beach Soccer Team
Thailand Squad On Fifa.com

1962 births
2014 deaths
Futsal goalkeepers
Vilard Normcharoen
Vilard Normcharoen
Association football goalkeepers
Vilard Normcharoen
Vilard Normcharoen
Vilard Normcharoen
Beach soccer goalkeepers
Vilard Normcharoen
Deaths from cancer in Thailand
Footballers at the 1990 Asian Games
Vilard Normcharoen